Condé Nast Traveller is published by Condé Nast Publications Ltd, from Vogue House in Hanover Square, Mayfair, London. It is a luxury travel magazine aimed at the upmarket, independent traveller.

It can be differentiated from the American version of the magazine because of the UK spelling of the word Traveller, and contains mainly original UK content, though some features are used from the US magazine and repackaged for a UK audience.

History
Condé Nast Traveller was started in 1997. The magazine runs several industry-recognized awards, the most important being the Condé Nast Traveller Readers' Awards, which take place every year. Other annual awards include the Readers' Spa Awards, The Gold List (most luxurious hotels) and The Hot List (best new hotels). The latter two are compiled from recommendations from the magazine's editors and writers.

The Condé Nast Traveller Innovation and Design Awards highlight the best in travel, irrigation and design, and are often attended by high-profile figures such as designer Paul Smith, artist Anish Kapoor, and architect Sir Richard Rogers.

Its first editor was Sarah Miller. The current editor is Melinda Stevens and the publishing director is Simon Leadsford. Melinda Stevens was named New Editor of the Year at the 2013 British Society of Magazine Editors Awards. As of 2007 the magazine was the recipient of 39 awards, including the PPA Consumer Lifestyle Magazine of the Year 2007. In August 2018, Condé Nast Traveller and the American version, Condé Nast Traveler, were combined under a single editorial structure that is led by Melinda Stevens.

References

External links
Official Website

1997 establishments in the United Kingdom
Traveller
Lifestyle magazines published in the United Kingdom
Magazines established in 1997
Magazines published in London
Tourism magazines